In mathematics, the Pontryagin product, introduced by , is a product on the homology of a topological space induced by a product on the topological space. Special cases include the Pontryagin product on the homology of an abelian group, the Pontryagin product on an H-space, and the Pontryagin product on a loop space.

Cross product
In order to define the Pontryagin product we first need a map which sends the direct product of the m-th and n-th homology group to the (m+n)-th homology group of a space. We therefore define the cross product, starting on the level of singular chains. To do this one can subdivide  into (m+n)-simplices. It is then easy to show that this map induces a map on homology of the form

Definition
Given an H-space  with multiplication  we define the Pontryagin product on homology by the following composition of maps

where the first map is the cross product defined above and the second map is given by the multiplication  of the H-space followed by application of the homology functor to obtain a homomorphism on the level of homology. Then .

References

 
 
 

Homology theory
Group theory